The Violent Enemy is a 1968 film directed by Don Sharp and starring Tom Bell, Susan Hampshire, Ed Begley, and Noel Purcell. The plot concerns an IRA plot to blow up a British power station.

Premise
IRA bomb expert Sean Rogan escapes from prison, and is reluctantly recruited into a scheme by IRA leader Colum O'More to blow up a British electronics factory back in Ireland. Rogan wants a peaceful life but O'More insists.

Rogan is given Hannah Costello to assist him. Inspector Sullivan is suspicious of Rogan.

Cast
Tom Bell – Sean Rogan
Susan Hampshire – Hannah Costello
Ed Begley – Colum O'More
Noel Purcell – John Michael Leary
Jon Laurimore – Austin
Michael Standing – Fletcher 
Philip O'Flynn – Inspector Sullivan

Production
The film was based on the 1966 novel A Candle for the Dead by Hugh Marlow. The Observer called it "fast and exciting".

Don Sharp had previously worked with the producers on Taste of Excitement (which would be released after this film). He says the original title of the film was Candle for the Dead.

The title was changed to Came the Hero when filming began in Waterford in October 1968. Sharp says it had a "nice cast" with Begley being "marvellous... it was a very good movie to make... Tom Bell was marvellous".

Release
Sharp says "everyone was delighted" with the film but just as it was about to be released, IRA activity started up again causing the film to be pulled.

Critical reception
The Monthly Film Bulletin called it a "moderately interesting if not particularly convincing melodrama".
 
Sky Movies described it as "one of only a handful of British films to deal with the troubles in Ireland. Played as a melodrama, the film is efficiently directed by action specialist Don Sharp. Tom Bell has the right air of disillusionment about him as the IRA man who's learned moderation in a British jail". The Radio Times noted, "it's efficiently made, if unsurprising, and familiar American actor Ed Begley is worth watching as the fanatical Irish mastermind behind the scheme."

The Independent said "The sum of all these substantial parts is less than a masterpiece. Too much of a hint of 'Oirish' accents among English actors. Too much talk of The Cause. Too little movement in the clock above Leary's bar, which is forever stuck at seven minutes past nine. Still it fills an idle hour and a half well enough."

References

External links

The Violent Enemy at BFI
The Violent Enemy at Letterbox DVD

1967 films
1960s crime films
British crime drama films
Films based on British novels
Films about The Troubles (Northern Ireland)
Films about the Irish Republican Army
Films scored by John Scott (composer)
1960s English-language films
1960s British films